Kele is a Bantu language of Gabon. Dialects of the Kele language are scattered throughout Gabon.

West Kele (Kili) is spoken by the Kele people, scattered in Middle Ogooué Province, Mimongo area.
Ngom (Angom, Ungomo) is used with only minor differences by the Kola/Koya Pygmies. It is spoken on both sides of the border with the Republic of the Congo.
Bubi (not the same as the Bubi language)
Tombidi
Mwesa

References

Kele languages
Languages of Gabon